Buffering is a British sitcom broadcast on ITV2. The series was created and is co-written by comedian Iain Stirling and Steve Bugeja, and began airing on 5 August 2021 with all episodes available on the ITV Hub on the same day. After a year hiatus, series two is set to air in 2023.

Cast 
Iain Stirling as Iain; A children's TV presenter.
Elena Saurel as Olivia
Jessie Cave as Rosie
Janine Harouni as Thalia
Rosa Robson as Ashley
Paul G Raymond as Greg
Sean Sagar as Robbie
Steve Bugeja as Finn
Phil Fletcher as Larry the Lizard
Samantha Womack as Steph

Episodes

References

External links

2021 British television series debuts
2020s British comedy television series
2020s British sitcoms
English-language television shows
ITV comedy
ITV sitcoms
Television series by ITV Studios